"In Between Days" is a 1985 song by The Cure.

It may also refer to:

 In Between Days (film) a 2006 film directed by So Yong Kim
 In Between Days (comic), Teva Harrison's account, in comic form, of her life with terminal cancer

See also
 In Between (disambiguation)